Scott Jones may refer to:
Scott Jones (athlete) (born 1998), British shot putter
Scott Jones (curler) (born 1971), Canadian curler
Scott Jones (American football) (born 1966), American football offensive tackle
Scott Jones (Australian footballer) (born 1995), Australian rules footballer for Fremantle
Scott Jones (English footballer) (born 1975), English football defender
Scott Jones (Puerto Rican footballer) (born 1983), American soccer midfielder
Scott J. Jones (born 1954), American theologian and bishop of the United Methodist Church
Scott A. Jones, founder of ChaCha search engine
Scott C. Jones, American writer and television presenter focused on video games and technology
Scott Jones (sheriff) (born 1967), sheriff of Sacramento County, California
Scott Jones, Canadian victim of anti-gay violence profiled in the documentary film Love, Scott
Scott Jones (Canadian civil servant), appointed in 2018 to head the Canadian Center for Cyber Security